The yellow-capped pygmy parrot (Micropsitta keiensis) is a species of parrot in the family Psittacidae mainly found throughout western New Guinea. Its natural habitats are subtropical or tropical moist lowland forest, subtropical or tropical mangrove forests, and subtropical or tropical moist montane forest. Like many parrots, this pygmy parrot is affectionate to its mate. It is currently unknown if they remain monogamous for life like many bigger parrots because of their isolated location, which is difficult to reach.

Description 
Adults of both sexes are green, have a yellow crown and undertail coverts, blue central tail feathers and brown eyes.
It has three subspecies: the nominate (M. k. keiensis), M. k. chloroxantha and M. k. viridipectus. Juveniles of M. k. keiensis are generally duller in color; the other subspecies are as in adults. Generally, they are approximately 9.5 cm (3.7 in) long and 11-14 g (0.4-0.5 oz) in weight.

References

yellow-capped pygmy parrot
Birds of the Aru Islands
Birds of Western New Guinea
yellow-capped pygmy parrot
Taxonomy articles created by Polbot